Marchanno Schultz (born 17 December 1972) is a Dutch former professional footballer who played as a midfielder for Eredivisie and Eerste Divisie clubs Feyenoord, De Graafschap, N.E.C. and Stormvogels Telstar between 1990 and 2003.

References

1972 births
Living people
People from Moerdijk
Dutch footballers
Association football midfielders
Feyenoord players
De Graafschap players
NEC Nijmegen players
SC Telstar players
Eredivisie players
Eerste Divisie players
Footballers from North Brabant